Kerema District is a district of the Gulf Province of Papua New Guinea.  Its capital is Kerema.

References

Districts of Papua New Guinea
Gulf Province